Sławacinek Stary  is a village in the administrative district of Gmina Biała Podlaska, within Biała Podlaska County, Lublin Voivodeship, in eastern Poland.

The village has an approximate population of 1,000.

The village's former name (Stary Sławacinek) was officially used until 1 January 2014.

References

Villages in Biała Podlaska County